Holt is an unincorporated community and census-designated place (CDP) in Tuscaloosa County, Alabama, United States. At the 2020 census, the population was 3,413. It is part of the Tuscaloosa, Alabama Metropolitan Statistical Area. Holt appeared on the 1930 census.

Geography
Holt is located at  (33.230467, -87.486303).

Demographics

Holt first appeared on the census in 1950 as the unincorporated community of Holt-Fox. It did not reappear again until 1990 when it was classified as a census-designated place (CDP) as Holt.

As of the census of 2000, there were 4,103 people, 1,785 households, and 1,252 families living in the community. The racial makeup of the community was 51.67% White, 47.04% Black or African American, 0.44% Native American, 0.02% Asian, 0.12% from other races, and 0.71% from two or more races. 1.49% of the population were Hispanic or Latino of any race.

There were 1,614 households, out of which 31.4% had children under the age of 18 living with them, 41.4% were married couples living together, 20.4% had a female householder with no husband present, and 33.0% were non-families. 28.5% of all households were made up of individuals, and 9.3% had someone living alone who was 65 years of age or older. The average household size was 2.54 and the average family size was 3.12.

In the community, the population was spread out, with 27.1% under the age of 18, 10.7% from 18 to 24, 27.5% from 25 to 44, 21.6% from 45 to 64, and 13.1% who were 65 years of age or older. The median age was 35 years. For every 100 females, there were 97.2 males. For every 100 females age 18 and over, there were 94.3 males.

The median income for a household in the community was $26,095, and the median income for a family was $33,165. Males had a median income of $28,212 versus $17,048 for females. The per capita income for the community was $13,116. About 11.3% of families and 20.2% of the population were below the poverty line, including 24.7% of those under age 18 and 23.3% of those age 65 or over.

2010 census
As of the census of 2010, there were 3,638 people, 1,385 households, and 925 families living in the community. The racial makeup of the community was 55.2% Black or African American, 39.4% White, 0.4% Native American, 0.2% Asian, 3.2% from other races, and 1.6% from two or more races. 7.2% of the population were Hispanic or Latino of any race.

There were 1,385 households, out of which 26.8% had children under the age of 18 living with them, 33.9% were married couples living together, 25.5% had a female householder with no husband present, and 33.2% were non-families. 28.2% of all households were made up of individuals, and 10.0% had someone living alone who was 65 years of age or older. The average household size was 2.63 and the average family size was 3.18.

In the community, the population was spread out, with 25.2% under the age of 18, 10.5% from 18 to 24, 26.0% from 25 to 44, 26.2% from 45 to 64, and 12.1% who were 65 years of age or older. The median age was 35.6 years. For every 100 females, there were 95.7 males. For every 100 females age 18 and over, there were 100.5 males.

The median income for a household in the community was $28,750, and the median income for a family was $32,731. Males had a median income of $23,517 versus $21,186 for females. The per capita income for the community was $13,964. About 24.7% of families and 31.9% of the population were below the poverty line, including 56.7% of those under age 18 and 19.0% of those age 65 or over.

Notable people
Johnny Shines, blues guitarist
Jimmy Walker, American football and basketball coach

See also

Cottondale, Alabama — adjacent unincorporated community in Tuscaloosa County
Alberta City, Tuscaloosa — adjacent suburb in Tuscaloosa County

References

Unincorporated communities in Alabama
Census-designated places in Tuscaloosa County, Alabama
Census-designated places in Alabama
Tuscaloosa, Alabama metropolitan area
Unincorporated communities in Tuscaloosa County, Alabama